Suceava railway station, also known as Burdujeni, is a railway station located in Suceava, Romania, completed in 1902. Originally part of Burdujeni village (now a suburb of Suceava), it is located at No. 7, Nicolae Iorga Street. The railway station was included on the 2004 list of historical monuments in Suceava County.

Suceava railway station was built between 1892-1902. Between 1902-1918 it was a train station at the Austro-Hungarian border, on the Romanian side. The historic building of Burdujeni railway station has baroque influences and it was designed in the architectural style of Fribourg railway station, located in Switzerland.

The train station was closed between 2000-2006, due to rehabilitation works carried out. Meanwhile, rail traffic was redirected to Suceava North railway station.

See also
 Suceava North railway station

References

Railway Station
Railway stations in Romania
Railway stations opened in 1902
Historic monuments in Suceava County